How to Succeed in Love (French: Comment réussir en amour, Italian: La moglie addosso) is a 1962 French-Italian comedy film directed by Michel Boisrond and starring Dany Saval, Jean Poiret and Jacqueline Maillan.

The film's sets were designed by the art director François de Lamothe.

Synopsis
A shy young man working in the publishing industry becomes entranced with a dancer he meets and sets out to win her over.

Cast
 Dany Saval as Sophie Rondeau
 Jean Poiret as Bernard Monod
 Jacqueline Maillan as Edmée Rondeau
 Jacques Charon as Le directeur des Editions du Soleil
 Hélène Duc as La femme du directeur des Editions du Soleil
 Maurice Chevit as L'agent
 Claude Piéplu as Le professeur de danse
 Audrey Arno as Gillian
 Dominique Davray as Joséphine
 Robert Seller as Le docteur
 Noël Roquevert as Le directeur des Editions Saint-Vincent-de-Paul
 Max Montavon as L'éditeur de chansons
 Roger Pierre as Marcel
 Michel Serrault as Le commissaire

References

Bibliography 
 Parish, James Robert. Film Actors Guide: Western Europe. Scarecrow Press, 1977.

External links 
 

1962 films
1962 comedy films
French drama films
1960s French-language films
Films directed by Michel Boisrond
Italian comedy films
1960s French films
1960s Italian films